Addison Whitney is a global branding firm headquartered in Charlotte, North Carolina. Founded in 1991, Addison Whitney has additional offices in New York City, Seattle, London, Tokyo and Munich. The company specializes in four core offerings, including Verbal Branding, Visual Branding, Brand Strategy, and Market Research, and serves clients across the healthcare, technology, consumer, financial, hospitality and business-to-business industries.

Addison Whitney created product names such as "Outlook" for Microsoft, "Kissables" for Hershey and "Escalade" for Cadillac.

History 

Addison Whitney was founded on May 20, 1991, as a global branding firm focused on brand name development. The firm was acquired by Interpublic in 1995. In 1998 Addison Whitney's management team decided to take the firm private. On June 1, 2007, inVentiv Health acquired Addison Whitney as part of their communications division.

In 2010, Addison Whitney Health was founded, focusing on healthcare and pharmaceutical clients.

Offices 

Addison Whitney currently has seven offices. In the United States, its global headquarters are in Charlotte, North Carolina, with offices in Seattle, Washington and New York City. Addison Whitney's European offices are located in London and Munich, with its Japanese operations based in Tokyo.

AW Helping Hands 

In 2008, Addison Whitney founded "AW Helping Hands", a company-wide volunteer initiative. As part of the corporate social responsibility campaign the AW Helping Hands team encourages Addison Whitney employees to participate in community service projects.

References

External links 
 Addison Whitney corporate website

Consulting firms established in 1991
1991 establishments in North Carolina